The Surfreter is a fretless electric guitar with a proprietary metal-alloy fretboard. It was first produced in 1997 using the Delta Metal technology originally developed for Vigier Guitars's Arpège fretless bass.

Notable Users
 Guthrie Govan
 Bumblefoot
 Shawn Lane
 John Paul Jones
 Gary Moore

External links
Surfreter Specifications

Electric guitars